Dry Creek is a stream in Oregon County, in the Ozarks of southern Missouri in the United States. It is a tributary to the Eleven Point River.

The stream flows generally north-northeast and passes under U.S. Route 160 about one quarter mile east of Royal Oak and gains the tributary Huddleston Branch.

References

Rivers of Oregon County, Missouri
Rivers of Missouri